NJE may refer to:
Network Job Entry (NJE), an IBM protocol
Nje, a letter of the Cyrillic script